Rose Kabagyenyi  (born 4 August 1974) is a Ugandan politician and woman Member of Parliament. In 2011, she was elected as a representative in Parliament for the Kisoro District.

She is a member of the ruling National Resistance Movement political party.

Education 
She completed her primary-level education from Gikoro primary school in 1987. In 1990, she completed her Uganda Certificate of Education (UCE) for lower secondary education at the Seseme Girls secondary school in Kisoro. She attained her first certificate in agriculture in 1995 and a diploma in agriculture from the Bukalasa Agricultural college in 2000.

In 2004, Kabagyenyi achieved a Bachelor's degree in Agriculture from Makerere University in Kampala. She went further with her studies and obtained her second diploma in 2011 and a second certificate in Monitoring and Evaluation from the Uganda Management Institute in 2013.

In 2014, Kabagyenyi earned herself a Master's degree in Agriculture from Makerere University

Work experience and other responsibilities 
From 1997 to 2000, Kabagyenyi worked as the Agricultural officer for the Kisoro local government and as a district agricultural officer for the Kisoro District from 2007 to 2010.

Kabagyenyi served as a consultant for National Agricultural Advisory Services (NAADS).

See also 

 Member of Parliament
 National Resistance Movement
 Parliament of Uganda
 List of members of the tenth Parliament of Uganda
 Kisoro District

References

External links 

 Website of the Parliament of Uganda
 Hon. Rose Kabagyeni  on Facebook
 Kabagyenyi Rose on Linkedin

Women members of the Parliament of Uganda
Living people
Members of the Parliament of Uganda
1974 births
Makerere University alumni
National Resistance Movement politicians
21st-century Ugandan women politicians
21st-century Ugandan politicians